The 1994 Davidoff Swiss Indoors was an ATP men's tennis tournament held in Basel, Switzerland and played on indoor hard courts that was part of the ATP World Series of the 1994 ATP Tour. It was the 25th edition of the tournament and was held from 26 September through 3 October 1994. Wayne Ferreira won his 4th title of the year, and 6th of his career.

Finals

Singles
 Wayne Ferreira defeated  Patrick McEnroe, 4–6, 6–2, 7–6(9–7), 6–3

Doubles
 Patrick McEnroe /  Jared Palmer defeated  Lan Bale /  John-Laffnie de Jager 6–3, 7–6

References

External links
 ITF tournament edition details

Davidoff Swiss Indoors
1994 in Swiss tennis